Gentry W. Boswell is a retired United States Air Force brigadier general who served as the director of manpower, organization, and resources of the United States Air Force. He was previously the commander of the 36th Wing and deputy commander of Joint Region Marianas.

References

External links

Year of birth missing (living people)
Living people
Place of birth missing (living people)
United States Air Force generals
Date of birth missing (living people)